The Man from New Mexico is a 1932 American Western film directed by J.P. McGowan and starring Tom Tyler, Caryl Lincoln and Robert D. Walker.

Cast
 Tom Tyler as Jess Ryder 
 Caryl Lincoln as Sally Langton 
 Robert D. Walker as Mort Snyder 
 Jack Richardson as Jim Fletcher 
 Lafe McKee as Sheriff 
 Frank Ball as 'Dad' Langton 
 Lewis Sargent as Bob Langton 
 Blackie Whiteford as Henchman Bat Murchison 
 Slim Whitaker as Henchman Russ 
 Frederick Ryter as Pancho 
 Jack Long as Hank 
 William L. Nolte as Henchman Slink 
 C.V. Bussey as Bud 
 Lee Tinn as Ching

References

Bibliography
 Martin, Len D. The Allied Artists Checklist: The Feature Films and Short Subjects of Allied Artists Pictures Corporation, 1947-1978. McFarland & Company, 1993.

External links
 

1932 films
1932 Western (genre) films
American Western (genre) films
Films directed by J. P. McGowan
American black-and-white films
Monogram Pictures films
1930s English-language films
1930s American films